The Common Booster Core (CBC) is an American rocket stage, which is used on the Delta IV rocket as part of a modular rocket system. Delta IV rockets flying in the retired Medium and Medium+ configurations each used a single Common Booster Core as their first stage, while the Heavy configuration uses three; one as the first stage and two as boosters.

The first static test-firing of a Common Booster Core was conducted on 17 March 2001, and the final test of the initial program was conducted on 6 May. Testing was conducted using Test Stand B-2 of the Stennis Space Center, a facility originally constructed for testing of the first stages of Saturn V rockets during the 1960s. The first launch of a Common Booster Core was the maiden flight of the Delta IV, which was launched from Space Launch Complex 37B at the Cape Canaveral Space Force Station on 20 November 2002.

The first flight of the Delta IV Heavy, featuring three Common Booster Cores, was conducted on 21 December 2004. On this flight all three CBCs malfunctioned, cutting off prematurely due to cavitation in their oxidizer lines, and resulting in the rocket reaching a lower orbit than that which had been planned. In response to the failure, additional pressure valves were installed on future launches.

As of September 2022, the Delta IV had made 43 flights; 29 in Medium and Medium+ configurations, and 14 in the Heavy configuration, resulting in a total of 71 Common Booster Cores being launched. Delta IV is retiring but two Delta IV heavy launches remain and will use six additional Common Booster Cores.

The CBCs are manufactured in United Launch Alliance's  manufacturing facility in Decatur, Alabama and then transported by the RS RocketShip to either Vandenberg Air Force Base or Cape Canaveral Air Force Station where they are integrated with the spacecraft and other components such as strap-on boosters and a Delta Cryogenic Second Stage.

See also
Universal Rocket Module, the Russian Angara common core.
Falcon Heavy, the SpaceX Falcon 9 multi-core variant.

References

Rocket stages
Delta (rocket family)